Martin Kwaku Adjei-Mensah Korsah (also known as “Nana Sɛmenhyia” (Problem Solver) is a Ghanaian politician and member of the Eighth Parliament of the Fourth Republic of Ghana representing the Techiman South Constituency in the Bono East Region on the ticket of the New Patriotic Party. He is currently the Deputy Minister for Local Government, Decentralization and Rural Development.

Early life and education 
Korsah was born on 12 April 1978 and hails from Techiman in the Bono East Region. He completed his SSSCE in 1998 where he studied Government, History and Christian Religious Studies (C.R.S) . He further had his Bachelors of Arts in Political Science in 2005 from the University of Ghana. He later obtained his master's degree in Politics and International Relations in 2007.

Career 
Korsah was a basic school coordinator of GES. He was also the presiding member of the Techiman Municipal Assembly. He was also the Director of Elections and Research for the New Patriotic Party.

Political career 
Korsah is a member of NPP and currently the MP for the Techiman South Constituency in the Bono East region. In the 2020 Ghana general elections, he won the parliamentary seat with 49,682 votes making 50.24% of the total votes cast whilst the NDC parliamentary aspirant Christopher Beyere Baasongti had 49,205 votes making 49.76% of the total votes cast. He was appointed as the deputy minister for Local Government, Decentralization and Rural Development.

Committees 
Korsah is a member of the House committee and also a member of Foreign Affairs Committee.

Personal life 
Korsah is a Christian.

Philanthropy 
In February 2022, Korsah presented dryers and sewing machines to over 500 hairdressers and seamstresses in Abanim, Ahenfi and Dwomor all in the Techiman South Constituency. He also presented bags of cements, clothes, roofing sheets and money to the Muslim Community in Hansua, Hausa line and Mamprusi line.

References 

Living people
1978 births
Ghanaian MPs 2021–2025
University of Ghana alumni
New Patriotic Party politicians
People from Bono East Region